Marcos Paulo Ramos da Silva, known as Marcos Paulo, is a Brazilian footballer who plays as a defensive midfielder for Inter SM.

References

External links
 
 Marcos Paulo at ZeroZero

1990 births
Living people
Sportspeople from Florianópolis
Association football midfielders
Brazilian footballers
Campeonato Brasileiro Série A players
Campeonato Brasileiro Série B players
Campeonato Brasileiro Série D players
Avaí FC players
Associação Atlética Iguaçu players
Coritiba Foot Ball Club players
Goiás Esporte Clube players
Clube Náutico Capibaribe players
Clube Atlético Bragantino players
Paraná Clube players
Rio Branco Sport Club players
Anápolis Futebol Clube players
Mirassol Futebol Clube players
Cuiabá Esporte Clube players